Ilona Kovács (born 3 July 1960) is a Hungarian basketball player. She competed in the women's tournament at the 1980 Summer Olympics.

References

1960 births
Living people
Hungarian women's basketball players
Olympic basketball players of Hungary
Basketball players at the 1980 Summer Olympics
Basketball players from Budapest